Carol Cassella is a bestselling novelist and practicing anesthesiologist. Born in Dallas, Texas, she lives on Bainbridge Island, Washington with her husband and two sets of twins.

Biography

Birth and Family 
Carol Cassella was born as Carol Elise Wiley in Dallas, Texas. She is the youngest of three daughters to Katherine and Ray Wiley, and graduated from Highland Park High School in Dallas, Texas in 1975.

Present 
Carol married Stephen Rowan Cassella in 1991 and now lives on Bainbridge Island, Washington. They are the parents of fraternal twins born in 1995, and identical twins born in 1996.

Education 

Carol has a degree in English literature from Duke University, where she was a member of Pi Beta Phi sorority. She attended medical school at Baylor College of Medicine in Houston, Texas and was president of her medical school class three of the four years. She received her medical degree in 1986 and completed her internship at Baylor-St. Lukes Affiliated Hospitals in Houston, Texas before moving to Seattle where she completed her residency in internal medicine at Virginia Mason Medical Center. In 1992 she returned to Virginia Mason for training in anesthesiology. Carol is board certified in both internal medicine and anesthesiology.

Career

Early career 
Immediately after college Carol worked for Prentice Hall Publishing Company in New York City before deciding to attend medical school.

Later career 
Carol is a practicing anesthesiologist in the Seattle area and also a published novelist. She was the founder of Mind to Mind, the literary section in Anesthesiology, the Journal of the American Society of Anesthesiology, and served as associate editor of the section from 2009 to 2016. She has been a Wall Street Journal Expert Panelist on Healthcare. She is also a founding member of Seattle7Writers, a non-profit supporting literacy and reading in the Pacific Northwest. Prior to writing fiction, Carol wrote medically centered articles for The Bill & Melinda Gates Foundation profiling their grant recipients working in low resource countries around the world. She published her first novel OXYGEN in 2008.

Medical career 
After completing her internal medicine residency at Virginia Mason Medical Center, Carol practiced primary care at Pacific Medical Center, SeaMar Community Clinic and Pike Market Community Clinic, with a special interest in cross-cultural medicine. In 1992 she began her residency in anesthesiology at Virginia Mason Medical Center and now works as a staff anesthesiologist in the Seattle area. Carol serves on the health care advisory committee for BOSIA, the Bainbridge Ometepe Sister Islands Association. BOSIA is a non-profit, non-partisan organization focused on people-to-people exchange between residents of Bainbridge Island in Washington State and Ometepe Island in Lake Nicaragua. She enjoys working as a volunteer for charitable medical trips working in low resource countries, including rural Costa Rica, Thailand, Indonesia, Nicaragua, Bhutan and Cuba.

Literary career 

Though she studied literature and wrote some fiction throughout her life, Carol did not begin a serious writing career until she was in her forties. “The unfulfilled desire to write fiction was a personal disappointment for a long time--years, really. I knew I wanted to write; I felt the drive to write, but I wasn't ready to devote myself to the task with the discipline it takes to succeed. I finally had to confront myself and decide to actively pursue writing fiction or accept that I was giving up. In the end, the idea of letting go of a lifelong dream was more painful than daring to try." In 2001 she enrolled in creative writing classes and began writing her first novel,Oxygen, which was published in 2008 by Simon & Schuster. The novel was a national bestseller, nominated for the Washington State Book Award, and  an Indie Next Pick in 2008. Her second novel, Healer, was also an Indie Next Pick in 2011. Her third novel, Gemini, was an Indie Next selection for March 2014, as well as a Library Reads selection, and won the Pacific Northwest Booksellers Association’s BuzzBooks contest. Her books have been highlighted as top choices by Library Journal, Booklist, Harpers Bazaar, People Magazine, Poets & Writers, Womans Day, and USA Today, among others. All of her novels draw from her personal experience as a physician, her role as a mother, and her interest in medical ethics and the complexities of contemporary healthcare. Prior to focusing on fiction, Carol wrote informational articles for The Bill & Melinda Gates Foundation from 1999 to 2001. She has also been published in the Wall Street Journal, The New York Times, Huffington Post, and other media outlets.

Seattle 7 Writers 
Carol is a founding member of Seattle 7 Writers, an organization founded in Seattle with the mission to support literacy organizations in the community and to create connections between writers, readers, booksellers, and librarians.

Bibliography 
Gemini (Simon & Schuster, 2014): After ICU doctor, Charlotte Reese is put in charge of an unidentified hit-and-run victim whose operation leaves her in a coma, her usual professional distance evaporates as she fights to find out what went wrong and finds herself making increasingly complicated decisions that will tie her forever to the patient's fate: Who is this patient? Who should decide her fate if she doesn't regain consciousness and ultimately, is a life locked in a coma worth living?

Healer (Simon & Schuster, 2010): When Claire Boehning starts working at a public health clinic, she meets Miguela, a bright Nicaraguan immigrant and orphan of the contra war who has come to the United States on a quest to find her extended family. As their friendship develops, a new mystery unfolds that threatens to destroy Claire's family and forces her to question what it truly means to heal.

Oxygen (Simon & Schuster, 2008): An anesthesiologist at the height of her career faces a malpractice suit after a disastrous operation that ends a child's life. At the same time, she has to cope with her aging father and ultimately confront questions of love and betrayal, family bonds, and the price of her own choices.

References

21st-century American novelists
American women novelists
Living people
21st-century American women writers
Year of birth missing (living people)
American anesthesiologists
Women anesthesiologists